Na Ry (born December 13, 1985) is the winner of Miss Korea 2008, which was held in Seoul's Sejong Center for the Performing Arts. She represented Korea in the 2009 Miss Universe pageant. When she won Miss Korea 2008, Na Ry was studying applied statistics at Yonsei University. She plays the violin and enjoys pilates.

References

External links
 Miss Korea 2008 profile
 Miss Universe 2009 profile
 
 

1985 births
Living people
Miss Universe 2009 contestants
South Korean female models
People from Seoul
Miss Korea winners
Yonsei University alumni